Ritchiea is a genus of flowering plants belonging to the family Capparaceae.

Its native range is Tropical Africa. It is found in Angola, Benin, Burkina, Burundi, Cabinda Province, Cameroon, Central African Republic, Congo, Equatorial Guinea, Ethiopia, Gabon, Gambia, Ghana, Guinea, Guinea-Bissau, Gulf of Guinea Island, Ivory Coast, Kenya, Liberia, Mozambique, Nigeria, Rwanda, Senegal, Sierra Leone, Sudan, Tanzania, Togo, Uganda, Zambia, Zaïre and Zimbabwe.
 
The genus name of Ritchiea is in honour of Joseph Ritchie (c. 1788 – 1819), an English surgeon, explorer and naturalist. 
It was first described and published in Gen. Hist. Vol.1 on page 276 in 1831.

Known species
According to Kew:
Ritchiea afzelii 
Ritchiea agelaeifolia 
Ritchiea albersii 
Ritchiea aprevaliana 
Ritchiea boukokoensis 
Ritchiea capparoides 
Ritchiea carrissoi 
Ritchiea erecta 
Ritchiea gossweileri 
Ritchiea jansii 
Ritchiea littoralis 
Ritchiea macrantha 
Ritchiea mayumbensis 
Ritchiea noldeae 
Ritchiea ovata 
Ritchiea pygmaea 
Ritchiea quarrei 
Ritchiea reflexa 
Ritchiea simplicifolia 
Ritchiea spragueana 
Ritchiea wilczekiana 
Ritchiea wittei 
Ritchiea youngii

References

Capparaceae
Brassicales genera
Plants described in 1831
Flora of West Tropical Africa
Flora of West-Central Tropical Africa
Flora of Northeast Tropical Africa
Flora of East Tropical Africa
Flora of South Tropical Africa